Wanigasekara Wanasinghe Mudiyanse Ralahamilage Pradeep Nilanga Dela (known as Pradeep Nilanga Dela; Sinhala:ප්‍රදීප් නිලංග දෑල) is the present Diyawadana Nilame or Chief Custodian of Sri Dalada Maligawa and 19th Diyawadana Nilame.  He acted as the Basnayake Nilame of Ruhunu Maha Kataragama devalaya and Sabaragamu Maha Saman devalaya, before being elected to the post of Diyawadana Nilame on July 1, 2005.

Nilanga was educated at Nalanda College, Colombo and was presented with Nalanda Keerthi Sri award in 2005 by his alma mater Nalanda College, Colombo.

Nilanga is the son of Dickson Sarathchandra Dela who was the Sri Lankan former High commissioner to Maldives and former Governor of Sabaragamuwa & Northern Province.

See also
Diyawadana Nilame, Sri Dalada Maligawa, Kandy

References 

Sources
 Nalanda College 2006 Prize Giving Ceremony
 Nalanda Keerthi Sri Awards

 මහනුවර දළදා මාළිගාවේ දියවඩන නිලමේ ප්‍රදීප් නිලංග දෑල මහතා සමග මුහුණට මුහුණ පිළිසඳර ..Exclusive interview with Hon.Pradeep Nilanga Dela - Diyawadana Nilame

Diyawadana Nilames
Sinhalese people
Sri Lankan Buddhists
Alumni of Nalanda College, Colombo
Living people
1973 births